Rugby 20 is a rugby union simulation video game developed by Eko Software and published by Bigben Interactive  for the PlayStation 4, Xbox One and PC.

Details
Rugby 20 is the only rugby union video game that exclusively features the best competitions and national teams in the Northern Hemisphere whilst the rights for the English national rugby team and other licences such as the Super Rugby competition, the Australian, Fijian, New Zealander and South African national teams are exclusively owned by their current rivals in the rugby video game industry, Rugby Challenge 4. However, neither rugby game officially detains the rights to include the official Rugby World Cup competition as a playable competition in their respective games.

Modes
The game retains some modes the previous rugby game developed and published by EKO Software and Big Ben Interactive respectively and also includes a wide variety of different modes that were not in Rugby 18. These modes include:

Quick match mode
The game makes it possible for people to play a quick match alone or with another person using the same console, or gamers can decide to play online against strangers or friends using up-to-date teams from any of the licensed competitions such as the Pro14, Top 14, Pro D2, Gallagher Premiership and various national teams.

League mode
League mode is a mode that allows players to pick their favourite sides in any of the playable leagues and lead them to victory by either playing the league matches or simulating them.

Training mode
Training mode is a new addition to the many other modes in Rugby 20 that allows players to practise their skills, whether it is going through set-plays, improving their tackling in game, perfecting passes, learning how and when to involve kicking in their game etc.

Challenges mode
Like in Rugby 18, Rugby 20 constantly provides players a list of challenges which vary in difficulty, thus allowing them to gain SP points in order to possibly buy booster cards from the collection modes and/or to level up one's player profiles.

My squad mode
The mode makes a re-appearance in the game, this time however, allowing players to create and edit the badge and kit of their fictional rugby team as well as designing the style and colours of the balls that they play with in their games. These teams can then be used in the solo mode or in offline and online matches as well.

Solo mode
A new and exciting feature in the series, solo mode enables people take their "My squad" from the D3 Gaul Division to the Elite Gaul Division or from the Celtic Championship - Development Division to the Celtic Championship - Star Division by hiring staff members, training their players` abilities and playing friendlies for extra SP points to ultimately get promoted each season if possible into a higher division and eventually, winning the highest division(s) that exist in the game.

Collection mode
Similar to FIFA 20's Ultimate Team Market, the collection mode lets gamers buy players by buying booster cards with SP points in order to recruit players into their "My squad" team which can be used to play in the solo mode.

Features
The weather in Rugby 20 now includes rainy day and a rainy night conditions along with clear day and clear night conditions which plays a large part in gameplay as rain causes pitches to deform in appearance while wind can randomly occur, possibly affecting the projection of the ball when kicked or passed, and for the first time in the series, player ratings would be given according to their Rugby Pass Index rating, where statistic specialists from Rugby Pass would use raw data from real-life games to give players ratings accordingly.

Teams and stadia
The game features the licence for all clubs in the Top 14, Pro D2, Gallagher Premiership and the Pro14. The national teams included in the game are Argentina (Un-licensed), Australia (Un-licensed), Canada, England (Un-licensed), Fiji (Un-licensed), France, Georgia, Italy, Ireland, Japan, Namibia, New Zealand (Un-licensed), Russia, Samoa, Scotland, South Africa (Un-licensed), Uruguay (Un-licensed), USA and Wales. There are also 10 un-licensed stadiums that range from amateur level stadiums to professional level stadiums.

Commentary
Commentary is once again provided in English by BT Sport's lead commentator Nick Mullins and will be joined by England rugby legend Ben Kay whereas French commentary will be provided by Canal+ Sport's lead commentator Éric Bayle and will be joined by former French rugby centre Thomas Lombard.

Reception

Rugby 20 received "generally mixed" reviews for the PS4 and Xbox One versions of the game according to the review aggregation website Metacritic.

Screen Rant gave the game a score of two and a half stars out of five and stated, "Intuitive controls make up a key part of why Rugby 20 can sometimes feel close to the real thing. Defensive gameplay in particular matches up well with the feel of watching a rugby match, and diving into tackles or frantically pressing to overpower the opposition works well. Another strong design choice was to use the bumper buttons to pass right and left, helping to try and recreate the flow of the sport." Whilst RUCK did not give the game a score, their analysis of the games was "Does Rugby 20 kick the ball through those goal posts? Not quite, but almost. Rugby 20 is as close to the sport as you can get without getting covered in mud, but it would be very difficult for a casual fan to pick up and play due to very complicated controls." Also Last Word on Rugby stated that the Rugby 20 is "a step forward for rugby games." and that the gameplay of the game is "another vast improvement upon previous versions of rugby games. It is easy to be overawed with the sheer volume of controls. However, the gameplay is intuitive and easy to pick up making it an enjoyable experience for all. Rugby is an extremely complex game so some of its more nuanced facets are slightly clunky."

References

2020 video games
Video games developed in France
Rugby union video games
Multiplayer and single-player video games
PlayStation 4 games
Xbox One games
Windows games
Nacon games
Eko Software games